Iputa is a rural locality (a selo) in Kukuninsky Selsoviet, Gergebilsky District, Republic of Dagestan, Russia. The population was 98 as of 2010.

Geography 
Iputa is located 19 km southwest of Gergebil (the district's administrative centre) by road. Maali and Darada are the nearest rural localities.

References 

Rural localities in Gergebilsky District